{{DISPLAYTITLE:C18H19N}}
The molecular formula C18H19N (molar mass: 249.35 g/mol, exact mass: 249.1517 u) may refer to:

 Benzoctamine
 4-Cyano-4'-pentylbiphenyl

Molecular formulas